Monte Video and the Cassettes were a New Zealand band that had a hit single "Shoop Shoop Diddy Wop Cumma Cumma Wang Dang".

About the band

Monte Video and the Cassettes consisted of Murray Grindlay. Murray was an ex-member of 1960s New Zealand band The Underdogs, but is better known today in New Zealand as the writer and voice of many advertising jingles (notably the Crunchie train robbery advertisement, perhaps New Zealand's longest-running television ad).

Discography

Studio albums

Singles

References

External links
 Album cover at Classic 45s
 Monte Video page at Re-Inventing Sheep
 Murray Grindlay Bio

New Zealand pop music groups